There is an under-16 youth team associated with the Finland national football team.

Current squad
The following 23 players have been called up during the recent year:

References 

European national under-16 association football teams
Under 16